Erico Aristotle Cabagnot Aumentado (born December 29, 1977), also known in Bohol as Aris, is a Filipino businessman and politician. He was a member of the House of Representatives, representing the second district of Bohol. He is the Governor of the Province of Bohol, assuming office on June 30, 2022.

Early life and education
Erico Aristotle is the youngest of 8 children of former Bohol governor and deputy speaker Erico Aumentado and Peregrina Cabagnot-Aumentado. He finished his elementary and secondary education at Bohol Wisdom School. He took up Bachelor of Science in Business Administration at the University of San Carlos in 1995.

Political career
Aumentado became a kagawad, and then chairman of the Sangguniang Kabataan in 1996–2001. Aumentado wanted to run as board member in 2010 elections but his father didn't allow any of his children to enter politics.

He served as chief of staff of his father until he was designated by the House of Representatives as the caretaker congressman of Bohol's second district to serve the remaining seven months left of his father's term in December 2012.

Representative, Bohol's 2nd District
On May 13, 2013, Aumentado won and elected as the new representative of the province's 2nd District. On May 9, 2016, he was re-elected for the second term. Like his father, Aumentado ran again for the third consecutive term and was re-elected on May 13, 2019.

During the 17th and 18th Congress, Aumentado is the chairperson of the Philippine House Committee on Science and Technology consisting of 29 members.

House Committee Membership
Chairman, Science and Technology
Member, Ecology
Member, Economic Affairs
Member, Foreign Affairs
Member, Information and Communications Technology
Member, Inter-Parliamentary Relations and Diplomacy
Member, National Defense And Security
Member, Public Order and Safety
Member, Public Works and Highways
Member, Trade and Industry

In October 2019, Aumentado firmly opposed the reported establishment of a coal power plant in Bohol through his House Bill 3710.

During the COVID-19 pandemic, Aumentado filed House Resolution No. 669 to temporarily ban Bohol-China flights to-and-fro Bohol-Panglao International Airport.

Passed Bills

Governor of Bohol
On May 10, 2022, Aumentado was proclaimed as new governor of province after defeating the then incumbent governor Arthur C. Yap via landslide.

On October 19, 2022, Aumentado was appointed chairman of Regional Development Council (RDC) in Central Visayas through a submitted transmittal letter from President Bongbong Marcos.

Personal life
Aumentado is married to Congresswoman Maria Vanessa Cadorna, also a former Miss Bohol Sandugo. They have three sons: Erico Vann Lawrence, Erico Vann Lance and Erico Vann Liam.

References

|-

People from Bohol
Governors of Bohol
1977 births
Living people
Members of the House of Representatives of the Philippines from Bohol
Nationalist People's Coalition politicians
Ubay, Bohol
University of San Carlos alumni